Clonroche is a village in County Wexford, Ireland.

History
From the mid-17th century until the early 20th century, the village of Clonroche was located on the large estate owned by the Carew family of nearby Ballyboro (later renamed Castleboro). From the 18th century onwards, their seat was Castleboro House, and a notable head of this family was Robert Carew (1787–1856).

Rev. James Bentley Gordon, who was Protestant rector of Killegney in 1798, wrote an account of the Irish Rebellion of 1798 and also wrote an account of the parishes of Killegney and Chapel that appeared in William Shaw Mason's Statistical Account or Parochial Survey of Ireland, printed in 1814.

A later author, Patrick Kennedy was also connected with Clonroche and the surrounding area (in his youth he attended school in Cloughbawn, in the townland of Clonroche, and resided in Castleboro and Courtnacuddy townlands). He wrote of the locality and its people (e.g., the clerics of Killegney parish) in  Banks of the Boro (1856). The Boro from the title is a small river that flows through the nearby countryside.

On 27 April 1920 the RIC barracks located in Clonroche was attacked by the IRA during the Irish War of Independence

Cloughbawn Parish
Clonroche is located in the Roman Catholic (R.C.) parish of Cloughbawn, in the Roman Catholic Diocese of Ferns. Cloughbawn R.C. Parish church is located at the edge of the village of Clonroche. Poulpeasty, 5 km away, is also in the R.C. parish of Cloughbawn, and has its own R.C. church and curate.

Cloughbawn in Irish means "the white rock" and the village is situated at the foot of the Blackstairs Mountains. The village is close to surrounding townlands, including Poulpeasty, Kilegney, Chapel, Castleboro, Ballyboro, Rathturtin, Tominearly, Meelgarrow, Raheen, and  Rathfardon, which stretches to the borders of Adamstown and Rathnure parishes.

There is also a Protestant church located about a kilometre from the village of Clonroche at Killegney. This is a Church of Ireland (C.O.I.) church. Killegney C.O.I. church was formerly part of the C.O.I. parish of Killegney, but today it is part of the United Parishes of Killegney, Rossdroit, Killane and Templeshanbo

Amenities
Clonroche village has two local stores, Greenes and Larkin's, along with Judes and Doyles pubs. There is also a petrol station, a chemist, a chipper and a hair salon.  The local creamery provides services and products for the large agricultural community. Local produce includes potatoes, strawberries, cereals, dairy products and pumpkins. Clonroche hosts an annual steam rally.

The local Gaelic Athletic Association club is Cloughbawn GAA Club. The club's hurling team competes at senior level, and reached the Wexford County Final in 2002 and 2015.

People
Cloughbawn GAA Club has been home to hurlers such as Tim Flood and Larry Murphy.

Clonroche is also the birthplace of Walter O'Brien, the founder and CEO of Scorpion Computer Services, and the inspiration for and an executive producer of the 2014 CBS television series </scorpion>.

See also
 List of towns and villages in Ireland

References 
Citations

Bibliography

 
Longfield, A. K. (ed.). The Shapland Carew Papers. Dublin: Stationery Office, 1946.

External links
Local website.

Towns and villages in County Wexford